J. Edward Green was an actor, playwright and production manager in the United States. He authored, directed, and acted in shows at the Pekin Theatre in Chicago. He staged works including musical comedies Captain Rufus, In Zululand, The Man from 'Bam, Mayor of Dixie, Two African Princes, Honolulu, Queen of the Jungles, Twenty Minutes from State Street, My Nephew's Wife, My Friend from Georgia, A Trip to Coontown, The Count of No Account, In Eululand, The Grafters and Doctor Dope. Doctor Dope was by Stanley Woods (playwright).

Green was described by a reviewer as picking out a stereotypical "foible of the Negro" to ridicule in his productions.

References

Year of birth missing
Year of death missing
African-American male actors
Vaudeville performers